The Mathews Mr Easy is an American homebuilt aircraft that was designed by Lyle Mathews and associates and produced by the Vintage Ultralight and Lightplane Association of Marietta, Georgia. It was the sixth and final design of Mathews. The aircraft is supplied in the form of plans for amateur construction.

Design and development

Mr Easy features a strut-braced and cable-braced biplane layout, a single-seat, open cockpit, fixed conventional landing gear and a single engine in pusher configuration, mounted above the tail boom tube.

The aircraft is made from bolted-together aluminum tubing, with its flying surfaces covered in doped aircraft fabric. The  standard engine used is the  Rotax 447 two-stroke twin-cylinder powerplant.

The designer estimates the construction time from the supplied plans as 250 hours.

Operational history

In the United States ultralights are not required to be registered, and in April 2014 no examples were in fact registered in the United States with the Federal Aviation Administration, although a total of two had been registered at one time.

Specifications (Mr Easy)

References

Mr Easy
Mathews Mr Easy
1990s United States sport aircraft
1990s United States ultralight aircraft
Single-engined pusher aircraft
Biplanes
Homebuilt aircraft